The John Henry Handicap was an American Thoroughbred horse race held annually at Hollywood Park Racetrack in Inglewood, California from 1986 through 1994. A Grade II event open to horses age three and older, it was contest on turf over a distance of one and one eighth miles (9 furlongs).

Inaugurated in 1986, it was named in honor of U.S. Racing Hall of Fame inductee John Henry, a four-time U.S. Champion Male Turf Horse and two-time U. S. Horse of the Year.

Records
Speed  record:
 1:45.00 - Leger Cat (1993)

Most wins:
 No horse won this race more than once.

Most wins by an owner:
  No owner won this race more than once.

Most wins by a jockey:
 2 - Bill Shoemaker (1986, 1989)
 2 - Eddie Delahoussaye (1988, 1994)
 2 - Corey Nakatani (1991, 1993)

Most wins by a trainer:
 3 - Charles E. Whittingham (1986, 1989, 1990)

Winners

References

Discontinued horse races
Graded stakes races in the United States
Open mile category horse races
Horse races in California
Hollywood Park Racetrack
Recurring sporting events established in 1986
Recurring sporting events disestablished in 1994
1986 establishments in California
1994 disestablishments in California